Gerd-e Kashan (also Romanized as Gerd-e Kāshān) is a village in Oshnavieh-ye Shomali Rural District, in the Central District of Oshnavieh County, West Azerbaijan Province, Iran. At the 2006 census, its population was 380, in 71 families.

References 

Populated places in Oshnavieh County